Koyyam is the part of Chengalai Panchayat, Kannur district, in the state of Kerala on the southwestern coast of India. Koyyam LP school is situated in "Koyyam". Koyyam Govt High School situated in Perinthaleri, Koyyam. The new bridge is constructing from koyyam to Velam, Mayyil. The transportation will be much easier to Kannur Town after completion Koyyam Bridge(23 km). The bridge will make koyyam is a very accessible place to the new Kannur International Airport, Mattannur. Main Airport Road will be passing through Koyyam from chempanthotti & Valakkai. This will be parallel rout for existing Parassinikkadavu from Taliparamba to Mattannur

Temples & masjid 
 Koyyam Sree Maha Vishnu Temple.
 Koyyam Puthiya Bhagavathi Kavu.
  koyyam juma masjid 
 shoukathul islam madrasa
 koyyam markaz*

Schools
 Koyyam LP School, Koyyam.
 Koyyam Govt High School.

clubs

 jawahar koyyam.
 Full jolly koyyam

Transportation
The national highway passes through Valapattanam town.  Goa and Mumbai can be accessed on the northern side and Cochin and Thiruvananthapuram can be accessed on the southern side.  The road to the east of Iritty connects to Mysore and Bangalore.   The nearest railway station is Kannur on Mangalore-Palakkad line. 
Trains are available to almost all parts of India subject to advance booking over the internet.  There are airports at Mattanur, Mangalore and Calicut. All of them are international airports but direct flights are available only to Middle Eastern countries.

References

External links
 Koyyam Website

Villages near Mayyil